A jug is a type of container commonly used to hold liquids. It has an opening, sometimes narrow, from which to pour or drink, and has a handle, and often a pouring lip. Jugs throughout history have been made of metal, and ceramic, or glass, and plastic is now common.
	
In British English, jugs are pouring vessels for holding drinkable liquids, whether beer, water or soft drinks.  In North American English these table jugs are usually called pitchers. Ewer is an older word for jugs or pitchers, and there are several others.

Several other types of containers are also called jugs, depending on locale, tradition, and personal preference.  Some types of bottles can be called jugs, particularly  if the container has a narrow mouth and has a handle.  Closures such as  stoppers or screw caps are common for these retail packages.

Etymology
The word jug is first recorded in the late 15th century as jugge or jubbe. It is of unknown origin, but perhaps comes from jug a term for a maidservant, in the same period. This in turn comes from the alteration of common personal names such as  Joan or Judith.

Beer 
In certain countries, especially New Zealand and Australia, a "jug" refers to a plastic container filled with two pints (just over a litre) of beer. It is usually served along with one or more small glasses from which the beer is normally consumed, although in some student bars it is more common for the beer to be drunk directly from the jug, which is usually served without the accompanying glass. (In the U.S., this may be called a pitcher—although few US pitchers are as small as a litre, generally holding between 64 and 128 U.S. fluid ounces, approximately 2-4 litres. In New Zealand and Australia a pitcher sometimes can refer to a much larger measure of beer.)

In Britain in those parts of the country where there is a choice between a pint (20 fluid ounces) tankard and a straight glass of beer, a tankard may be called a tankard or a "jug". A jug of beer may also refer to a jug containing larger amounts (usually sized in pints), but if a large jug is sold it will be advertised as such in the pub and this helps to reduce confusion.

Music

In American folk music, an empty jug (often stoneware used for American whiskey) is sometimes used as a musical instrument, being played with buzzed lips to produce a trombone-like tone. It is often part of a jug band, to which ensemble it lends its name.

Examples
A variety of containers are sometimes called “jugs”.

See also 

 Bartmann jug
 Bridge spouted vessel
 Carboy
 Creamer (vessel)
 Face jug
 Fuddling cup
 Growler (jug)
Jug wine
 Jugging
 Harvest jug
 Puzzle jug
 Toby Jug
 Silver claret jug
 Wenlok jug

References

External links 
 

Vessels
Drinkware
Beer vessels and serving
Pottery shapes
Liquid containers